Bricker is a surname. Notable people with the surname include:

 Calvin Bricker, Canadian athlete
 Clifford Bricker, Canadian long-distance runner
 Erika Bricker, American swimmer
 John W. Bricker, United States Senator and Governor of Ohio
 Karl Bricker, Swiss cross country skier
 Pam Bricker, jazz singer
 Victoria Bricker (born 1940), American anthropologist and ethnographer

See also

 Bricker Amendment, collective name of a series of proposed amendments to the United States Constitution
 Bricker end-to-side anastomosis, widely used technique for performing ureteroenteric anastomosis
 Bricker & Eckler, Ohio law firm
 The Bricker Building, historic building in Los Angeles, California, USA.